SteamPunk Magazine was an online and print semi-annual magazine devoted to the steampunk subculture which existed between 2007 and 2016. It was published under a Creative Commons license, and was free for download. In March 2008, SteamPunk Magazine began offering free subscriptions to incarcerated Americans, as a "celebration" of 1% of the US population being eligible.

SteamPunk Magazine was formerly published by anarchist zine publisher Strangers in a Tangled Wilderness in the United States and by Vagrants Among Ruins in the United Kingdom. The magazine was then published by the worker-run Combustion Books in New York City and distributed by AK Press.

Reception and recognition
Two of the editors, Magpie Killjoy and Libby Bulloff, were at the 2008 Maker Faire in the San Francisco Bay Area.
The popular blog Boing Boing has also announced every Steampunk Magazine release to date, including their Steampunk's Guide To The Apocalypse.
SteamPunk Magazine was mentioned in a Newsweek article discussing the steampunk movement as an example of a steampunk periodical.
An article in The Yale Herald uses SteamPunk Magazine as an example of microcultures and their ability to thrive on the Internet.

Issues

Issue #1
Putting the Punk Back into Steampunk

Interviews with:
Author Michael Moorcock
The Original Steampunk Band, Abney Park
Singer/Songwriter Thomas Truax
Composer Darcy James Argue

Issue #2
A Journal of Misapplied Technology

Contents include:
John Reppion

Issue #3
The Sky is Falling

Contents include:
Alan Moore
Interview with Doctor Steel

Issue #4
Our Lives as Fantastic as any Fiction

Contents include:
Donna Lynch and Steven Archer

Issue #5
Long Live Steampunk!

Contents include:
Musician Voltaire

Issue #6
The Pre-Industrial Revolution

Contents include:
Author John Reppion
Interview with Ghostfire

Issue #7
Contents include:
Articles on race and steampunk as well as the future of steampunk fashion
Interviews with Sunday Driver and The Men That Will Not Be Blamed for Nothing

Issue #8
Contents include:
Instructions for making laudanum and a lexicon of 19th century New York City slang
Interview with Unwoman

References

External links
Homepage

Biannual magazines published in the United States
Defunct literary magazines published in the United States
Downloadable magazines
Magazines established in 2007
Magazines disestablished in 2016
Magazines published in New York City
Steampunk literature
Visual arts magazines published in the United States